STS-4 was the fourth NASA Space Shuttle mission, and also the fourth for Space Shuttle Columbia. Crewed by Ken Mattingly and Henry Hartsfield, the mission launched on June 27, 1982, and landed a week later on July 4, 1982. Due to parachute malfunctions, the SRBs were not recovered.

STS-4 was the final test flight for the Space Shuttle; it was thereafter officially declared to be operational. Columbia carried numerous scientific payloads during the mission, as well as military missile detection systems.

Crew 

STS-4, being the last test flight of the Space Shuttle, was also the last to carry a crew of two astronauts. Commander Ken Mattingly had previously flown as Command Module Pilot on Apollo 16, and was also the original Command Module Pilot for Apollo 13 before being replaced by his backup, Jack Swigert. Hartsfield was a rookie astronaut who had transferred to NASA in 1969 after the cancellation of the Air Force's Manned Orbiting Laboratory (MOL) program. He had previously served as a capsule communicator on Apollo 16, all three Skylab missions, and STS-1. Both men had graduated from Auburn University, the only time an entire NASA flight crew were graduates of the same university.

Backup crew 
From STS-4 onwards, NASA halted the appointment and training of complete backup flight crews. Instead, individual flight crew members were assigned backups who could take their place within the prime crew. The decision on whether to appoint a reserve crew member was made on a per-flight basis by flight management teams at Johnson Space Center. Consequently, the last NASA flight to have a full-time backup crew was STS-3.

Support crew 
 Roy D. Bridges Jr. (entry CAPCOM)
 Michael L. Coats
 S. David Griggs (ascent CAPCOM)
 George D. Nelson
 Brewster H. Shaw

Mission summary 
STS-4 launched from Kennedy Space Center (KSC) on June 27, 1982, at 15:00:00UTC, with Ken Mattingly as commander and Henry Hartsfield as pilot. This mission marked the first time the Space Shuttle launched precisely at its scheduled launch time. It was also the last research and development flight in the program, after which NASA considered the shuttle operational. After this flight, Columbia's ejection seats were deactivated, and shuttle crews did not wear pressure suits again until STS-26 in 1988.

STS-4's cargo consisted of the first Getaway Special (GAS) payloads, including nine scientific experiments provided by students from Utah State University, and a classified U.S. Air Force payload of two missile launch-detection systems. A secret mission control center in Sunnyvale, California participated in monitoring the flight. Mattingly, who was an active-duty naval officer, later described the classified payload – two sensors for detecting missile launches – as a "rinky-dink collection of minor stuff they wanted to fly". The payload failed to operate.

In the shuttle's mid-deck, a Continuous Flow Electrophoresis System and the Mono-disperse Latex Reactor flew for the second time. The crew conducted a lightning survey with hand-held cameras, and performed medical experiments on themselves for two student projects. They also operated the Remote Manipulator System (Canadarm) with an instrument called the Induced Environment Contamination Monitor mounted on its end, designed to obtain information on gases or particles being released by the orbiter in flight.

Columbia landed on July 4, 1982, at 16:09:31UTC, on the  concrete runway 22 at Edwards Air Force Base, the first orbital Shuttle landing on a concrete runway. This time the lead escorting T-38 "Chase 1" was piloted by Guy Gardner with crewmate Jerry L. Ross. President Ronald Reagan and his wife Nancy greeted the crew upon arrival. Following the landing, President Reagan gave a speech to the crowd gathered at Edwards, during which he declared the Space Shuttle operational. He was followed by remarks from Mattingly and Hartsfield and a flyover of the new shuttle Challenger atop the Shuttle Carrier Aircraft (SCA), headed for KSC.

The mission achieved all objectives except for the Air Force payload, but the SRBs were lost when their main parachutes failed, causing the empty casings to impact the ocean at high velocity and sink. This and STS-51-L were the only missions where the SRBs were not recovered. Columbia returned to KSC on July 15, 1982.

Gallery

Mission insignia 
The path of the red, white, and blue streak on the mission patch forms the numeral "4", indicating the flight's numerical designation in the Space Transportation System's mission sequence.

Wake-up calls 
NASA began a tradition of playing music to astronauts during the Project Gemini, and first used music to wake up a flight crew during Apollo 15. Each track is specially chosen, often by the astronauts' families, and usually has a special meaning to an individual member of the crew, or is applicable to their daily activities.

See also 

 List of human spaceflights
 List of Space Shuttle missions

References

External links 
 STS-4 mission summary. NASA.
 STS-4 video highlights . NSS.

Space Shuttle missions
Edwards Air Force Base
Spacecraft launched in 1982
June 1982 events
1982 in California
Spacecraft which reentered in 1982
July 1982 events
1982 in Florida
Ken Mattingly